Border River is a 1954 American Western film directed by George Sherman and starring Joel McCrea, Yvonne De Carlo and Pedro Armendáriz.

Plot
During the US Civil War, Clete Mattson arrives in Zona Libre, a small territory across the river from the United States. Ruled by ruthless General Calleja, it offers sanctuary to outlaws. Mattson wants to buy guns for the Confederacy, using gold stolen from the Union.

Cast
 Joel McCrea as Clete Mattson 
 Yvonne De Carlo as Carmelita Carias
 Pedro Armendáriz as General Calleja (as Pedro Armendariz)
 Alfonso Bedoya as Captain Vargas
 Howard Petrie as Newlund
 Renate Hoy as Annina Strasser (as Erika Nordin)
 George J. Lewis as Sanchez
 Nacho Galindo as Lopez
 Ivan Triesault as Baron Von Hollden
 George Wallace as Fletcher
 Lane Chandler as Anderson
 Martin Garralaga as Guzman
 Joe Bassett as Stanton
 Salvador Baguez as General Robles
 Felipe Turich as Pablo

Production
Joel McCrea and Yvonne de Carlo's casting was announced in April 1953. George Sherman was assigned to direct.

Filming began on 3 June 1953, the same day as Universal's The Glenn Miller Story. The two films were the first movies made at Universal for four weeks.

Parts of the film were shot in Colorado River, Professor Valley, and Courthouse Wash in Utah.

References

External links
 
 
 
 

American Western (genre) films
Universal Pictures films
1954 Western (genre) films
1954 films
Films directed by George Sherman
Films set in Mexico
Films shot in Utah
1950s English-language films
1950s American films